Phong Thạnh Đông  is a commune (xã) and village in Giá Rai District, Bạc Liêu Province, in south-western Vietnam.

References

Populated places in Bạc Liêu province
Communes of Bạc Liêu province